Kanakkampalayam is a town in Tiruppur district in the Indian state of Tamil Nadu.

Demographics
 India census, Kanakkampalayam had a population of 12,180. Males constitute 50% of the population and females 50%. Kanakkampalayam has an average literacy rate of 79%, higher than the national average of 59.5%: male literacy is 85%, and female literacy is 74%. In Kanakkampalayam, 9% of the population is under 6 years of age.

References

Cities and towns in Tiruppur district